Koromľa is a small village and municipality in the Sobrance District in the Košice Region of east Slovakia.

Geography
The village lies at an altitude of 280 metres and covers an area of 13.035 km².
It has a population of about 520 people.

Culture
The village has a public library, a gym, a football pitch, two stores, a pub and a post office.

There is one Greek Catholic church.   
A creek runs through the center of the village with a linear park between two roads.

Genealogical resources

The records for genealogical research are available at the state archive "Statny Archiv in Presov, Slovakia"

 Roman Catholic church records (births/marriages/deaths): 1837-1931 (parish B)
 Greek Catholic church records (births/marriages/deaths): 1834-1902 (parish A)

See also
 List of municipalities and towns in Slovakia

External links
 
https://web.archive.org/web/20110226112651/http://app.statistics.sk/mosmis/eng/run.html
http://en.e-obce.sk/obec/koromla/koromla.html
https://web.archive.org/web/20160731010351/http://koromla.e-obce.sk/
Surnames of living people in Koromla

Villages and municipalities in Sobrance District